The Duet technical routine competition at the 2022 World Aquatics Championships was held on 17 and 19 June 2022.

Results
The preliminary round was started on 17 June at 13:00. The final was held on 19 June at 16:00.

Green denotes finalists

References

Duet technical routine